Two ships of Furness Withy were named Derwent River:

, sold in 1932 to Greece
, acquired in 1946, sold in 1947

Ship names